Trapdoor spider is a common name that is used to refer to various spiders from several different groups that create burrows with a silk-hinged trapdoor to help them ambush prey.

Several families within the infraorder Mygalomorphae contain trapdoor spiders:
 Actinopodidae, a family otherwise known as 'mouse-spiders', in South America and Australia
 Antrodiaetidae, a family of 'folding trapdoor spiders' from the USA and Japan
 Barychelidae, a family of 'brush-footed trapdoor spiders' with pantropical distribution
 Ctenizidae, a family of 'cork-lid trapdoor spiders' in tropical and subtropical regions
 Cyrtaucheniidae, a family of 'wafer-lid trapdoor spiders, with wide distribution except cooler regions
 Euctenizidae, a family of spiders that make wafer-like or cork-like trapdoors
 Halonoproctidae, a family of spiders that make wafer-like or cork-like trapdoors and includes the phragmotic genus Cyclocosmia
 Idiopidae, a family of 'spurred-trapdoor spiders' or 'armoured trapdoors' mostly in Southern Hemisphere
 Migidae, also known as 'ridge fanged trapdoor spiders' or 'tree trapdoor spiders', in the Southern Hemisphere
 Nemesiidae, a family of 'tube trapdoor spiders', with both tropical and temperate species worldwide
 Theraphosidae, a family of tarantulas (where just a few species make trapdoors), also with wide distribution

There is also one family of trapdoor spiders in the suborder Mesothelae:
 Liphistiidae, an unusual and unique family of spiders with armoured abdomens from Southeast Asia, China and Japan

Set index articles on spiders
Set index articles on animal common names